The King Hussein Cancer Center (KHCC) (Arabic مركز الحسين للسرطان), is a Cancer hospital in Amman, Jordan. It treats both adult and pediatric patients. KHCC treats over 3500 new cancer patients every year from Jordan and the region.

The Center was initially named Al-Amal center (hope center) founded in 1997 by the late King Hussein. In 2002, the center was renamed to the King Hussein Cancer Center in honor of the late King who died from cancer complications. The King Hussein Cancer Foundation (KHCF) undertakes various fundraising activities to support and maintain the place. KHCF is a free-standing, independent, non-governmental, nonprofit organization established by a royal decree to combat cancer in Jordan and the Middle East region. The foundation and center is run by a board of trustees consisting of a dedicated group of prominent volunteers and chaired by Princess Ghida Talal. The Director General of KHCF is Mrs. Nisreen Qatamish and Dr. Asem Mansour is the Director General of KHCC.

Departments:
Although KHCC is a cancer center, it has every specialty physician any other hospital has, the only diffidence is they are only avaiblbe for cancer patients that belongs to KHCC

Radiation oncology: 
KHCC alone has more than 16 sub-specialized radiation oncologist, subspecialty in radiation oncology (according to site treated) is only found in US, Canada and KHCC.
Subspecialty allows accurate treatment and better outcomes.
KHCC also uses the latest most innovated technology in radiotherapy (e.g. IMRT,VMAT, SBRT & SRS).
KHCC currently is a house to 6 CT-linacs, 1-MR linac, 2-CT-sims and 1 MR-sim, which allows to treat various types of cancer and accommodate large numbers of patients.

History

Prior to the mid-1980s, there was no infrastructure for treating cancer patients in Jordan. For quality care, wealthy patients sought treatment abroad, while those without means were treated locally, with limited resources and poor results.

In 1997, the Al-Amal Center, meaning "The Center of Hope", opened its doors. This cancer-specific hospital was established to provide the many patients in Jordan with care comparable to that offered in the West. To honor the late King Hussein, who had died of cancer, the center was renamed the King Hussein Cancer Center in 2002.

In 2006,  Mahmoud Sarhan became the director general and CEO of the King Hussein Cancer Center. Dr. Sarhan, a former professor of pediatrics in the Bone Marrow and Stem Cell Transplantation Program at Duke University, was an instrumental figure in the center’s establishment. He founded KHCC's bone marrow transplantation (BMT) program in 2003, a program which has become one of the largest and most successful BMT programs in the Middle East. It is one of the largest (performing approximately 100 bone marrow transplants each year) and most successful programs in the Middle East, achieving cure rates compatible with international standards. The program oversees both matched allogeneic and autologous transplants and performs transplants utilizing cord blood, making it the only program in Jordan and the second in the region that offers such a highly specialized procedure. Other non-cancer cases are also treated through the KHCC BMT program including thalassemia, aplastic anemia and other metabolic diseases.

Accreditations 
 JCI Disease Specific Certification (DSC) - First cancer center outside of the United States,  (November 2007).

International affiliations
 The US-Middle East Partnership for Breast Cancer Awareness and Research: in collaboration with the University of Texas MD Anderson Cancer Center
 St. Jude Children’s Research Hospital, Memphis, Tennessee, USA
 Lombardi Comprehensive Cancer Center of Georgetown University, USA
 Moffitt Cancer Center, USA
 The National Cancer Institute Egypt
 The Hospital for Sick Children, Canada
 The Stefan Morsch Foundation, Germany
 Susan G. Komen for the Cure, USA
 Roswell Park Comprehensive Cancer Center, NY, USA

Activities
In 2007, KHCF and KHCC were entrusted to lead the first national breast cancer program, Jordan Breast Cancer Program (JBCP), in partnership with the Ministry of Health and other stakeholders. The main objectives of the program are to reduce morbidity and mortality from breast cancer through awareness campaigns, early detection and access to screening for all women in Jordan in order to shift the current state of diagnosis to the early stages of the disease, when it is most curable with high survival rates.

JBCP’s operations are managed by an executive board led by KHCC and KHCF which provides its direction and ensures the implementation of action plans. Princess Dina Mired, director general of KHCF and Dr. Mahmoud Sarhan, director general of KHCC, together chair the Jordan Breast Cancer Committee and the executive board.

In 2010, the King Hussein Cancer Center and the American University of Beirut Medical Center signed a memorandum of understanding to create a joint program in research.

Fund raising expedition to Mount Kilimanjaro

A team of Jordanians went on an expedition to Mount Kilimanjaro in 2014 in an effort to support the cancer research initiatives of the King Hussein Cancer Center and collected $1.3 million.

The team was led by Mostafa Salameh; and others include  Iman Mutlaq.

See also
King Hussein Medical Center

References

External links
 Official website

Hospital buildings completed in 1997
Hospitals in Amman
Hospitals established in 1997
1997 establishments in Jordan
Cancer hospitals